The 1975 Marshall Thundering Herd football team was an American football team that represented Marshall University as an independent during the 1975 NCAA Division I football season. In its first season under head coach Frank Ellwood, the team compiled a 2–9 record and was outscored by a total of 291 to 110. Mark Brookover, Steve Morton, and Jesse Smith were the team captains. The team played its home games at Fairfield Stadium in Huntington, West Virginia.

Schedule

References

Marshall
Marshall Thundering Herd football seasons
Marshall Thundering Herd football